Arounna Khounnoraj is a Canadian multi-disciplinary artist, teacher and author.

Khounnoraj immigrated with her family to Canada from Laos as a child. studied at the Ontario College of Art and Nova Scotia College of Art and Design, and has a Master of Fine Arts from the University of Waterloo.

She operates Bookhou, a Toronto-based business, with her husband John Booth. Launched as a studio in 2002, the couple opened a storefront in 2008 and operate as an online retailer. Specializing in home decor and accessories, the couple produce and sell items such as bags, furniture, artwork and ceramics. The name of the store is a portmanteau of the couple's surnames. It operates out of a building owned by the couple where they live with their two children.

Khounnoraj is credited with generating a renewed interest in punch needle embroidery after a video she posted utilizing the technique went viral. She has since run several work shops and published a book about the topic titled Punch Needle: Master the Art of Punch Needling Accessories for You and Your Home (2019). Her second book Visible Mending: A Modern Guide to Darning, Stitching and Patching the Clothes You Love was released in 2020. She’s is currently working on her third book “Embroidery” out in 2022.

See also
 List of University of Waterloo people

References

Living people
Canadian people of Laotian descent
University of Waterloo alumni
21st-century Canadian women artists
Year of birth missing (living people)
Canadian embroiderers